Mohan Jose is an Indian actor in Malayalam cinema. He has acted more than 100 films. He came into movie industry portraying villains and later began acting in different  comedy and character roles. He is the son of famous singer  Pappukutty Bhagavathar.

Career
Mohan Jose was a government officer in Bombay. He debuted in Chamaram in 1980. Later he moved to Madras to become a full-time movie actor. Rajavinte Makan, Bhoomiyile Rajakkanmar, New Delhi, Nair Saab, Aye Auto, Lelam, Crime File, Black, Nerariyan CBI, Roudram, Crazy Gopalan are a few among other Malayalam Movies in which he portrayed versatile and inimitable characters.

Personal life

He was born  as the eldest son of famous singer Pappukutty Bhagavathar and Baby at Vypin. Playback singer Selma George is his sister. Malayalam film director K. G. George is his brother-in-law.  He had his primary education from M.G.M School, Thiruvalla and Santa Cruz High School, Ernakulam District. Mohan Jose is married to Felishya a beautician by profession, in 1988.  The couple has one daughter named Lovna. He lives in Kochi with his family.

Filmography

 Eesho (2022)
 Keshu Ee Veedinte Nadhan (2021)
 Ganagandharvan (2019)
 Thoppil Joppan (2016)
 Welcome to Central Jail (2016)
 Loham (2015)
 Ring Master (2014)
 Nadodimannan (2013)
 Daivathinte Swantham Cleetus (2013)
  Bavuttiyude Namathil (2012)
 Masters (film) (2012)
  Teja Bhai & Family (2011)
  College Days (2010)
  Chattambinadu (2009)
  Roudram (2008)
  Annan Thambi (2008)
  Crazy Gopalan (2008)
 Chess (2006 film)
Bhargavacharitham Moonam Khandam (2006)
 Thaskara Veeran (2005)
 Nerariyan CBI (2005)
Kochi Rajavu (2005)
 Thommanum Makkalum (2005)
 Bus Conductor (2005)
 Udayon (2005)
 Black (2004 film)
 Runway (2004 film)
 Kannadikadavathu (2000)
 Mark Antony (film) (2000)
 Crime File (1999)
 Pathram (1999)
 Vazhunnor (1999)
 F.I.R. (film) (1999)
 Thachiledathu Chundan (1999)
 Lelam (1997)
 Rajaputhran (1996)
 Agnidevan (1995)
 Thacholi Varghese Chekavar (1995)
 Indian Military Intelligence (1995)
 paalayam (1994)
 Chief Minister K.R. Gowthami (1994)
 Gandharvam (1993)
 Oru Kochu Bhoomikulukkam (1992)
 Aanaval Mothiram (1991)
 Kadalorakkaattu (1991)
 Cheppu Kilukanna Changathi (1991)
 Thudarkadha (1991)
 Aye Auto (1990)
 Indrajaalam (1990)
 Appu (1990)
 His Highness Abdullah (1990)
 Nair Saab (1989)
 Manu Uncle (1988)
 Dhinarathrangal (1988)
 Tantram (1988)
 New Delhi (1988 film) -Hindi
 1921 (film) (1988)
 Antima Teerpu (1988 film) -Telugu
 New Delhi (1988 film) _kannada
 New Delhi (1987 film)
 January Oru Orma (1987)
 Bhoomiyile Rajakkanmar (1987)
 Vazhiyorakazchakal (1987)
 Yuvajanotsavam (1986)
 Nyayavidhi (1986)
 Rajavinte Makan (1986)
 Aayiram Kannukal (1986)
 Irakal (1985)
 Adaminte Vaariyellu (1984)
 Panchavadi Palam (1984)
 Lekhayude Maranam Oru Flashback (1983)
 Yavanika (1981)
 Dhanya (film) (1981)
 Justice Raja (1981)
 Chamaram (1980)

References

External links

 Mohan Jose at MSI

Indian male film actors
Male actors from Kochi
Male actors in Malayalam cinema
Living people
Year of birth missing (living people)
20th-century Indian male actors
21st-century Indian male actors